Events from the year 1448 in Ireland.

Incumbents
 Lord: Henry VI
 Lieutenant of Ireland – Richard, Duke of York
 Lord Chancellor – Richard Wogan

Events
 The Franciscan friary Muckross Abbey is established in County Kerry

Births
 Thomas Butler of Cahir, member of the Butler Dynasty (died 1476)